The 1911–12 team finished with a record of 3–8. It was the 1st and only year for head coach Frederick Beyerman. The team captain was Oda A. Hindelang.

Schedule

|-
!colspan=9 style="background:#006633; color:#FFFFFF;"| Non–conference regular season

1. EMU shows 1/20 and CMU shows 1/19.
2. EMU shows 23-58 and UDM shows 16-62
3. EMU shows 26-52 and UMD shows 8-47.

References

Eastern Michigan Eagles men's basketball seasons
Michigan State Normal